Alkhalaj (also known as ‘Alī Khalaj) is a village in Abbas-e Gharbi Rural District of Tekmeh Dash District, Bostanabad County, East Azerbaijan province, Iran. At the 2006 census, its population was 2,373 in 544 households. The following census in 2011 counted 2,164 people in 586 households. The latest census in 2016 showed a population of 1,730 people in 539 households; it was the largest village in its rural district.

References 

Bostanabad County

Populated places in East Azerbaijan Province

Populated places in Bostanabad County